Clarence Keiser Hinkle (June 19, 1880 – July 21, 1960) was an American painter and art educator. His art studio was in Laguna Beach, California and later in Santa Barbara, California.

Early life and education
Hinkle was born on June 19, 1880, in Auburn, California. At age 18 he studied at Crocker Art Gallery under painter William Franklin Jackson. By 1900, he moved to San Francisco to study at San Francisco Art Institute (then known as California School of Design) with Arthur Frank Mathews. From 1901 until 1903, he enrolled in the Art Students League of New York and studied under John Twachtman and William Merritt Chase. From 1904 until 1906, he studied at Pennsylvania Academy of the Fine Arts in Philadelphia.

In May 1906, he was awarded the Cresson Scholarship, a traveling scholarship to Paris for two years of travel, and he studied at the Académie Julian. While studying in Paris, Hinkle was influenced by Impressionism and Pointillism.

Career 
From 1912 until 1917, Hinkle lived in San Francisco. He moved to Los Angeles in 1917 and taught at Louise Elizabeth Garden MacLeod's Los Angeles School of Art and Design. Hinkle later taught painting and drawing at the Chouinard Art Institute from 1921 until 1935. His students included Millard Sheets and Phil Dike, among others. He taught his students to experiment with their work, paint from nature, and use loose brushstrokes to capture the subject. Hinkle had a wife, Mabel Bain and she had been a former student.

He had an art studio in Laguna Beach, California from 1922 to 1935, and he was a member of the Laguna Beach Art Association. Hinkle opened another studio in Santa Barbara, California in 1935. He painted landscapes, still lifes and portraits. Hinkle painted many coastal landscapes in the 1920s. Initially while living in California Hinkle worked within Impressionist style, but eventually moved in to more of an expressionistic modernist style, he is also associated with Post-Impressionism. Other early-Modernist in California include Rinaldo Cuneo, Ray Strong, and Charles Reiffel.

Hinkle was a member of the Group of Eight, alongside artists Edouard Vysekal, Luvena Buchanan Vysekal, John Hubbard Rich, Henri De Kruif, Donna N. Schuster,  E. Roscoe Shrader, and Mabel Alvarez. This Group of Eight was organized largely by Luvena Buchanan Vyeskal and Edouard Vyeskal, and the group had a basis in the progressive art movement in California.

Death and legacy 
He died on July 21, 1960, in Santa Barbara, at age 80. His wife Mabel donated one of his paintings to the Smithsonian American Art Museum posthumously. More than a hundred of Hinkle's paintings were left by his estate to the University of Pacific, which were sold in 1986 to a single collector in Santa Barbara.

His work was acquired by the San Diego Museum of Art, the Santa Barbara Museum of Art, the De Young Museum in San Francisco, and the Los Angeles County Museum of Art.

In 2012, more than 114 of his paintings were exhibited at the Laguna Art Museum.

Exhibitions 
This is a select list of notable exhibitions that featured Hinkle.

Solo exhibitions 

 1960 – Clarence Hinkle: 1880-1960, solo exhibition, Santa Barbara Museum of Art, Santa Barbara, California
 2012 – Clarence Hinkle, solo exhibition at Laguna Art Museum, Laguna Beach, California

Group exhibitions 

 1922 – group exhibition with Hinkle, Edward Weston, Margrethe Mather, Howard Russell Butler, Jean Mannheim, Henri De Kruif, John Hubbard Rich, John Wesley Cotton, Howell Chambers Brown, Nellie Huntington Gere, at the MacDowell Club, Tajo Building, Los Angeles, California
 1933–1934 – Painting and Sculpture from 16 American Cities, group exhibition, Museum of Modern Art (MoMA), New York City, New York
 1962 – Clarence Hinkle and William Rohrbach, group exhibition, Esther Bear Gallery, Santa Barbara, California
 2004 – Laguna Beach: Our Town in the Early 1900s, group exhibition with Hinkle, William Wendt, Joseph Kleitsch, Edgar Alwin Payne, Anna Althea Hills, at Laguna Art Museum, Laguna Beach, California
 2012 – Modern Spirit and the Group of Eight, group exhibition with Hinkle, Mabel Alvarez, Henri de Kruif, John Hubbard Rich, Donna N. Schuster, E. Roscoe Shrader, Edouard Vysekal, Luvena Buchanan Vysekal, at Laguna Art Museum, Laguna Beach, California

Further reading

References

External links 
 

1880 births
1960 deaths
People from Auburn, California
People from Laguna Beach, California
People from Santa Barbara, California
San Francisco Art Institute alumni
Art Students League of New York alumni
Pennsylvania Academy of the Fine Arts alumni
Académie Julian alumni
American portrait painters
American still life painters
Painters from California
19th-century American painters
20th-century American painters